was one of four s of the Imperial Japanese Navy (IJN). It capsized in a storm on 12 March 1934, shortly after its completion. This incident forced the IJN to review the stability of all recently completed, under construction and planned ships. It was salvaged and put back into service after extensive modifications. During World War II, the Tomozuru fought in the Battle of the Philippines and in the Dutch East Indies campaign as an escort, and it continued to play that role for the rest of the war.

The Tomozuru Incident
In February 1934, Tomozuru joined the 21st Torpedo Flotilla at Sasebo.

01:00, 12 March 1934, Tomozuru departed from Sasebo for a night torpedo exercise with the light cruiser  and torpedo boat . 
03:25, because of stormy weather, Tatsuta ordered the other two boats to return to base.
03:58, radio contact lost with Tomozuru. Possible loss of power or radio capability.
04:12, Tomozurus lights disappeared, presumably this is when it capsized.
14:05, a rescue plane discovered the capsized Tomozuru drifting.
07:00, 13 March 1934, Tomozuru was towed by Tatsuta back to Sasebo. 100 crew were lost.

The instability of the Chidoris arose from Japanese efforts to circumvent the various naval treaties. They had designed small vessels of around 600 tons, but with the weaponry of a destroyer of twice the displacement. Weight had been saved by lighter construction but gun systems remained complex and heavy. After the launch of the lead ship, its high centre of gravity - even higher than feared - had been noted and efforts made to remedy this. High-speed sea trials showed it to be unstable, however, and further efforts were made to rectify the problem by adding bulges to the hull. Eventually Chidori satisfied the examiners and it was commissioned and the construction of the class, including Tomozuru, proceeded. At the time of its loss, Tomozuru was low on consumables such as fuel or water that would have ballasted it and lowered its centre of gravity. On the other hand, munitions were fully loaded, so the situation was significantly worse than on its sea trials.

Consequences
The cause of Tomozuru capsizing was a low metacentric height. The IJN established a committee and inspected the stability of all vessels. As a result of the inspection, the IJN discovered a lack of rolling performance, among others, in the following vessels:

 Aircraft carriers : 
 Cruisers : 
 Destroyers : ,  and es
 Submarine tenders : Taigei
 Minesweepers :  and es
 Subchasers : 

The significance of this incident is that it severely challenged Japanese assumptions over the stability of their warships and prompted a major review of the design of all Japanese warships. Existing vessels had their superstructures reduced and ships planned and under construction were redesigned during 1934-35. In particular the s were significantly altered.

Service

The ship was later repaired and saw service against China and in World War II. It was part of the naval support force for the invasion of Netherlands New Guinea in April 1942 and was present in the Banda Straits in July 1942.

During the war the rear gun was landed and replaced with Type 96 25mm AA guns. A total of ten of these were carried by the end of the war. The number of depth charges carried was also increased over the course of the war to 48.

Tomozuru was sunk 220 km north-west of Okinawa on 24 March 1945 by U.S. carrier-based aircraft.

Notes

References

External links
Failure knowledge database
IJN Tomozuru: Tabular Record of Movement

Chidori-class torpedo boats
Ships built by Maizuru Naval Arsenal
1933 ships
Shipwrecks in the Philippine Sea
World War II naval ships of Japan
Ships sunk by US aircraft
Torpedo boats sunk by aircraft
World War II shipwrecks in the Pacific Ocean
Maritime incidents in 1934
Maritime incidents in March 1945

de:Tomozuru-Klasse